Larrick is a hamlet in the parish of Lezant (where the population of the 2011 census was included.), Cornwall, England.

References

Hamlets in Cornwall